The men's 100 metre backstroke event at the 1948 Olympic Games took place between 4 and 6 August, at the Empire Pool. This swimming event used the backstroke. Because an Olympic-size swimming pool is 50 metres long, this race consisted of two lengths of the pool.

Medalists

Results

Heats

The fastest two in each heat and the four fastest third-placed from across the heats advanced.

Heat 1

Heat 2

Heat 3

Heat 4

Heat 5

Heat 6

Semifinals

The fastest three in each semi-final and the fastest from across the semi-finals advanced.

Semifinal 1

Semifinal 2

Key:  Q = qualification by place in heat, q = qualification by overall place

Final

References

Men's backstroke 100 metre
Men's events at the 1948 Summer Olympics